Twin Thousands is an American indie-pop band from Brooklyn, New York. The band's core members are Gretta Cohn (previously of the band Cursive and regular Saddle Creek Records cellist) and Ryan Smith (A Million Billion, The Silent League), other members include Kevin Thaxton, Thayer McClanahan, Peter Smith and Gene Park. To date they have released one EP and one single, limited to 200 and 500 copies respectively. Their single 'Like You A Lot' also featured a contribution from Kelly Pratt of Arcade Fire, a promotional video for the song was produced by Agag Films. As of April 2010, Twin Thousands' debut LP is complete and is available for listening on the band's MySpace page, although there has yet to be any word on whether or not a physical version of the album will be made available.

Discography

Albums
 Twin Thousands (2010)

Singles and EPs
 Summer EP (2007, self-released)
 "Like You A Lot" (23 July 2007, EXERCISE1 Records)

Compilation albums
 Ten (Like You A Lot and Fireworks) (24 September 2007, EXERCISE1 Records)

External links
Twin Thousands on MySpace

American pop music groups